The Companies Act 1862 (25 & 26 Vict. c.89) was an Act of the Parliament of the United Kingdom regulating UK company law, whose descendant is the Companies Act 2006.

Provisions
s 6 'Any seven or more persons associated for any lawful purpose may, by subscribing their names to a memorandum of association, and otherwise complying with the requisitions of this Act in respect of registration, form an incorporated company, with or without limited liability.'
s 8 'Where a company is formed on the principle of having the liability of its members limited to the amount unpaid on their shares, hereinafter referred to as a company limited by shares, the Memorandum of Association shall contain the following things' the third of which was 'objects for which the proposed company is to be established.'
s 11 'The memorandum of association... shall, when registered, bind the company and the members thereof to the same extent as if each member had subscribed his name and affixed his seal thereto, and there were in the memorandum contained, on the part of himself, his heirs, executors and administrators, a covenant to observe all the conditions of such memorandum, subject to the provisions of this Act.'
s 12 stating the memorandum could be altered by special resolution, if the memorandum allowed that itself.
s 18 dealt with the effect of incorporation.
s 48
s 153

Under section 167 of the Companies Act 1862 (25 & 26 Vict c 89) one of the functions of a liquidator was to bring criminal proceedings against directors and others who were alleged to have committed offences in relation to the company.

Cases decided under the 1862 Act
In re Wiltshire Iron Co (1868) LR 3 Ch App 443
Guinness v Land Corporation of Ireland (1882) 22 Ch 349
Salomon v A Salomon & Co Ltd [1897] AC 22
Ashbury Railway Carriage & Iron Co Ltd v Riche (1875) LR 7 HL 653

In popular culture
In the song "Some seven men form an association" in Gilbert and Sullivan's Utopia, Limited, King Paramount reforms the island of Utopia into a limited-liability company under the provisions of the Companies Act. However, in the operetta, it is instead referred to as "the Joint Stock Companies Act of sixty-two," perhaps also alluding to the Joint Stock Companies Act 1844 which was referenced in their previous opera, The Gondoliers.

See also

Companies Act
UK company law
History of companies
Limited Liability Act 1855
Joint Stock Companies Act 1856
Companies (Consolidation) Act 1908 (c 69)
Companies Act 1929
Companies Act 1948
Companies Act 1985
Companies Act 2006

Notes

References

External links
Company Registration For Foreign Individual & Foreign Companies

United Kingdom company law
United Kingdom Acts of Parliament 1862